Babiná is a village and municipality of the Zvolen District in the Banská Bystrica Region of Slovakia

History
In historical records, the village was first mentioned in 1254. In 1270 German colonists settled here. It belonged to Dobrá Niva. in the 16th century it had to pay tributes to Turks. In the 17th century, it belonged to the Esterházy family.

Genealogical resources

The records for genealogical research are available at the state archive "Statny Archiv in Banska Bystrica, Slovakia"

 Roman Catholic church records (births/marriages/deaths): 1731-1896 (parish A)
 Lutheran church records (births/marriages/deaths): 1791-1895 (parish A)
 Census records 1869 of Babina are not available at the state archive.

See also
 List of municipalities and towns in Slovakia

External links
 
 
https://www.webcitation.org/5QjNYnAux?url=http://www.statistics.sk/mosmis/eng/run.html  
http://www.e-obce.sk/obec/babina/babina.html
Surnames of living people in Babina

Villages and municipalities in Zvolen District